Methyl radical is an organic compound with the chemical formula  (also written as •). It is a metastable colourless gas, which is mainly produced in situ as a precursor to other hydrocarbons in the petroleum cracking industry. It can act as either a strong oxidant or a strong reductant, and is quite corrosive to metals.

Chemical properties 

Redox behaviour 

The carbon centre in methyl can bond with electron-donating molecules by reacting:
 + R• → 
Because of the capture of the nucleophile (R•), methyl has oxidising character. Methyl is a strong oxidant with organic chemicals. However, it is equally a strong reductant with chemicals such as water. It does not form aqueous solutions, as it reduces water to produce methanol and elemental hydrogen:
2  + 2  → 2  +

Structure 

The molecular geometry of the methyl radical is trigonal planar (bond angles are 120°), although the energy cost of distortion to a pyramidal geometry is small. All other electron-neutral, non-conjugated alkyl radicals are pyramidalized to some extent, though with very small inversion barriers. For instance, the t-butyl radical has a bond angle of 118° with a  barrier to pyramidal inversion.

Chemical reactions 

Methyl undergoes the typical chemical reactions of a radical. Upon treatment with an alcohol, it converts to methane and either an alkoxy or hydroxyalkyl. Reduction of methyl gives methane. When heated above, at most, methyl decomposes to produce methylidyne and elemental hydrogen, or to produce methylene and atomic hydrogen:
 → CH• + 
 →  + H•
Methyl is very corrosive to metals, forming methylated metal compounds:
M + n  → M(CH3)n

Production

Biosynthesis
Some radical SAM enzymes generate methyl radicals by reduction of S-adenosylmethionine.

Acetone photolysis 
It can be produced by the ultraviolet photodissociation of acetone vapour at 193 nm:
 → CO + 2

Halomethane photolysis 

It is also produced by the ultraviolet dissociation of halomethanes:
 → X• +

Methane oxidation 

It can also be produced by the reaction of methane with the hydroxyl radical: 
OH• + CH4 →  + H2O
This process begins the major removal mechanism of methane from the atmosphere.  The reaction occurs in the troposphere or stratosphere. In addition to being the largest known sink for atmospheric methane, this reaction is one of the most important sources of water vapor in the upper atmosphere.

This reaction in the troposphere gives a methane lifetime of 9.6 years. Two more minor sinks are soil sinks (160 year lifetime) and stratospheric loss by reaction with •OH, •Cl and •O1D in the stratosphere (120 year lifetime), giving a net lifetime of 8.4 years.

Azomethane pyrolysis 

Methyl radicals can also be obtained by pyrolysis of azomethane, CH3N=NCH3, in a low-pressure system.

In the interstellar medium 

Methyl was discovered in interstellar medium in 2000 by a team led by Helmut Feuchtgruber who detected it using the Infrared Space Observatory. It was first detected in molecular clouds toward the centre of the Milky Way.

References 

Astrochemistry
Free radicals
Oil refining
Yl